Vladimir Voevodin (born May 25, 1962, Moscow) is a computer scientist, professor at Lomonosov Moscow State University, the Faculty of Computational Mathematics and Cybernetics (MSU CMC) , Deputy Director of MSU Research Computing Center, corresponding member of the Russian Academy of Sciences, Professor, Dr.Sc.

Biography
In 1979, after finishing high school (physical-mathematical school No. 52, Moscow), Vladimir Voevodin entered Moscow State University, the Faculty of Computational Mathematics and Cybernetics, from which he graduated with honours in 1984.
He received his Candidate of Sciences degree in Physics and Mathematics in 1989 for a thesis entitled «Macroanalysis of Parallel Structure of Sequential Programs and Algorithms.»
In 1990 he obtained a degree of Doctor of Science in Physics and Mathematics for his doctoral thesis «Analytical and practical methods for investigation of fine structure of applications.» 
In 2003 he was elected corresponding member of the Russian Academy of Sciences.

Vladimir Voevodin has served at MSU since 1984. He started his career in the Computer Systems Laboratory, then, in 1990, he began working in the Research Computing Center (MSU RCC), first as a research associate, then as a senior research associate until taking up his present position of Deputy Director of the MSU RCC in 1990. 
In 2013 Vladimir Voevodin was appointed to his current position of Head of Supercomputers and Quantum Informatics Department, MSU CMC.

Since 1988 Vladimir Voevodin has been a professor at the Faculty of Computational Mathematics and Cybernetics, MSU. He holds a course «Parallel Data Processing» and heads a special seminar «Parallel Computing».
Vladimir Voevodin is one of the organizers of the MSU Educational and Scientific Center of High-Performance Computing.

Vladimir Voevodin is the head of Informational Analytical Center on Parallel Computing  (Parallel.ru).
He has made 65 reports at scientific conferences and has obtained 9 rights certificates to software.
He has supervised 10 Ph.Ds.

Research area 
Parallel computing, mathematical methods for research of program fine structures, methods for description and analysis of computer architecture, parallel programming technology, program optimization methods for supercomputers and parallel computing systems, the Internet-based technology and organization of distributed computing, metacomputing.

Awards and honours
Vladimir Voevodin won MSU Shuvalov Prize for his series of papers “Analytical and practical methods for investigation of fine structure of applications" in 2000. He was awarded the Russian Federation Government Prize in education in 2002 and Lomonosov Prize for teaching activity in 2015. He is also Honoured Worker of Higher Education of the Russian Federation and  a winner of Russian Federation President contest of grants for young Doctors of Science.

References

External links
 Vladimir Voevodin on the website Russian Academy of Sciences 
 Vladimir Voevodin —  Biography of Vladimir Voevodin at the website of the MSU Faculty of Computational Mathematics and Cybernetics 
 Vladimir Voevodin — scientific works on the website Math-Net.Ru 
 Vladimir Voevodin — scientific works on the website ISTINA MSU
 Vladimir Voevodin — dans le programme ACADEMIA sur TV Culture 

Russian computer scientists
Living people
Moscow State University alumni
Academic staff of Moscow State University
Soviet computer scientists
Soviet mathematicians
1962 births